Douglas Bradford "Brad" Park (born July 6, 1948) is a Canadian former professional ice hockey player. A defenceman, Park played in the National Hockey League (NHL) for the New York Rangers, Boston Bruins and Detroit Red Wings. Considered to be one of the best defencemen of his era, he was named to an All-Star team seven times. The most productive years of his career were overshadowed by superstar Bobby Orr, with whom he played for a brief time. Unlike Orr's, however, his teams never hoisted the Stanley Cup. Park was elected to the  Hockey Hall of Fame in 1988. In 2017, he was named one of the '100 Greatest NHL Players' in history.

Playing career
As a youth, Park played in the 1960 Quebec International Pee-Wee Hockey Tournament with the Scarboro Lions and 1965–1966 with the Toronto Westclairs and Toronto Marlboros (until 1968). He was drafted by the New York Rangers in the first round (second overall) in the 1966 NHL Amateur Draft and, after a brief stint with the minor-league Buffalo Bisons of the AHL, began playing for the Rangers in 1968.

New York Rangers
Park developed into the best Rangers defenceman, whose offensive skill, stickhandling and pugnacity made him popular with local fans and media. He even drew occasional comparisons with the Boston Bruins superstar Bobby Orr, universally acclaimed to be the greatest at his position in hockey history. Years afterward, Park remarked, "I saw no reason to be upset because I was rated second to Bobby Orr. After all, Orr not only was the top defenceman in the game but he was considered the best player ever to put on a pair of skates. There was nothing insulting about being rated No. 2 to such a super superstar."

Park was made the alternate captain of the Rangers and briefly served as their captain. In 1972, despite the loss of team scoring leader Jean Ratelle to a broken ankle, Park led the Rangers past the defending champion Montreal Canadiens in the first round of the playoffs. The Rangers advanced to the Stanley Cup finals where they fell to the Boston Bruins in six games. After the visitors staved off elimination in Game 5 at Boston, Bruins assistant captain Phil Esposito said famously, "If the Rangers think they're going to beat us in the next two games, they're full of 'Park' spelled backwards," Sure enough, the Bruins put them away in Game 6 at Madison Square Garden. Park finished a distant second to Orr in the Norris Trophy vote. 

When the upstart World Hockey Association tried to lure Park away, the Rangers re-signed him to a $200,000-a-year contract that made him, briefly, the highest-paid player in the NHL.

In the 1972 Summit Series, with Orr unable to play due to injury, Park emerged as a key contributor to Team Canada's series over the Soviets, being named Best Defenceman of the series.

After opening the 1975–76 season with their worst start in ten years, the Rangers began to unload its high-priced veterans. Park, along with Jean Ratelle and Joe Zanussi, was traded to the Boston Bruins in a November 7 blockbuster deal that also sent Phil Esposito and Carol Vadnais to the Rangers. The New York press and public had felt that Park, 27 at the time, was overweight, overpaid and over the hill, as he was facing unfavourable comparisons to Denis Potvin.

Boston Bruins
While Esposito and Vadnais were effective players for the Rangers, the team remained mired at the bottom of the division after "the trade", and Rangers general manager Emile Francis was eventually fired. Contrary to expectations that the Rangers had gotten the better end of the trade, the struggling Bruins were instantly rejuvenated and soon again became one of the NHL's best teams, despite the departures of Phil Esposito and Bobby Orr.

Taking over the mantle of leadership from Orr, whose career was threatened by injury and who would soon leave the team, Park continued his success under coach Don Cherry. Park had previously been an end-to-end puck carrier, but with the Bruins, he was told by Cherry to concentrate on defence. Getting over his unpopularity in Boston when he was a member of the arch-rival Rangers, Park made a relatively smooth transition to his new team, even hitch-hiking a ride from two teenagers at 1 am after his car ran out of gas, and Park later rewarded them with free tickets to the next Boston home game.

From 1977-79, Cherry's "Lunch Pail A.C." captured three division titles for the Bruins. Park earned two first All-Star team selections, while coming in second in the Norris Trophy race twice in a Bruins' uniform, with 1977-78 being considered one of his finest seasons. In 1977 and 1978, Park was a key contributor to Boston's back-to-back appearances in the Stanley Cup Finals where they lost to the Montreal Canadiens both times.  His last highlight with Boston came in Game 7 of the Adams Division finals against the Buffalo Sabres in the 1983 playoffs, when Park scored the game-winning goal in overtime and help Boston advance in to the conference finals — Park's career overlapped with the first four years of the emerging superstar defenceman of the Bruins, Raymond Bourque, from 1979 to 1983.

Detroit Red Wings
The following season (1983–84), Park signed with the Detroit Red Wings as a free agent. He won the Bill Masterton Trophy for perseverance that same year, having set a record for assists by a Red Wings' defenceman (53). After the 1985 season, still an effective player but hobbled by repeated knee injuries, he announced his retirement. The next year, he briefly served as Detroit's coach.

Retirement and personal life
In 1988, Park was elected in his first year of eligibility to the Hockey Hall of Fame in his hometown of Toronto.

Park has resided on the North Shore of Massachusetts and on Sebago Lake in Maine for almost 40 years, with his wife Gerry. He has five children and eight grandchildren. His autobiography, Straight Shooter: The Brad Park Story, was published in August, 2012.

Career statistics

Regular season and playoffs

International

Coaching statistics

Honours and achievements
 Named to the first All-Star team in 1970, 1972, 1974, 1976 and 1978.
 Named to the second All-Star team in 1971 and 1973.
 Runner up in Norris Trophy voting in 1970, 1971, 1972, 1974, 1976 and 1978
 Received both the most First Team All-Star nominations (other than Earl Seibert, who retired before the trophy was awarded) and was runner-up for the Norris more times without winning the Norris than any other defenceman in NHL history.
 Played in the NHL All-Star Game in 1970, 1971, 1972, 1973, 1974, 1975, 1976, 1977 and 1978.
 The book 'Play the Man' (Dodd, Mead, & Co.) written by Brad Park and Stan Fischler was published in 1971. 
 Retired as the leading defence scorer in Rangers' history and the second leading defence scorer in Bruins' history to Bobby Orr.
 At the time of his retirement, had played the most seasons in league history for a player never missing the playoffs.
 Currently 13th all-time in NHL history in defence scoring.
 Elected to the Hockey Hall of Fame in 1988, in his first year of eligibility.
 Along with Butch Goring, one of the last two active players who had played in the 1960s.
 In 1998, he was ranked number 49 on The Hockey News' list of the 100 Greatest Hockey Players.
 In the 2009 book 100 Ranger Greats, was ranked No. 11 all-time of the 901 New York Rangers who had played during the team's first 82 seasons

See also
List of members of the Hockey Hall of Fame
List of NHL players with 1000 games played

References

External links

1948 births
Living people
Bill Masterton Memorial Trophy winners
Boston Bruins players
Buffalo Bisons (AHL) players
Canadian ice hockey coaches
Canadian ice hockey defencemen
Detroit Red Wings coaches
Detroit Red Wings players
Hockey Hall of Fame inductees
National Hockey League All-Stars
National Hockey League first-round draft picks
New York Rangers draft picks
New York Rangers players
Ice hockey people from Toronto
Toronto Marlboros players